The Golden Reel Award for Outstanding Achievement in Sound Editing - Sound Effects, Foley, Dialogue and ADR for Documentary Feature Film is an annual award given by the Motion Picture Sound Editors. It honors sound editors whose work has warranted merit in the field of cinema; in this case, their work in the field of documentary feature (theatrical) film. The award has been given with its current title since 2018.

Winners and nominees

Outstanding Achievement in Sound Editing - Sound Effects, Foley, Dialogue and ADR for Animated Feature Film

References

External links
Official MPSE Website

Golden Reel Awards (Motion Picture Sound Editors)